The Sächsisches Ständehaus (Saxon House of Estates) is a building in Dresden which was built to house the Landtag of the Free State of Saxony.

Paul Wallot built the Sächsisches Ständehaus between 1901 and 1907. The Landtag had previously met in the Landhaus.

References

Buildings and structures in Dresden
Heritage sites in Saxony